Ereyanga (r. 1098–1102 CE) was the son of Vinayaditya and distinguished himself as a Chalukya feudatory during their campaigns against Dhara of Malwa. Though his rule as a monarch of Hoysala Empire was short, he served his father as the Yuvaraja. He was a Jain by faith.

He took the title- 'Vira Ganga'.

Life
Ereyanga was born to the Hoysala king Vinayaditya and his wife Keleyabbe or Keleyala Devi. He was appointed the Yuvaraja in 1062, and seems to have held that position for 33 years. He first distinguished himself by helping Chalukya Someshvara II in suppressing rebellions. Ereyanga is described as a right hand to Someshvara, and was an important commander in the Chalukya army. He is said to have burnt Dhara, a city of the king of Malwa, struck terror into the Cholas, laid waste to Chakragotta and broken the king of Kalinga.

Ereyanga had 3 sons through his wife Echala Devi- Ballala, Bitti Deva & Udayaditya. Ballala succeeded his grandfather Vinayaditya to the throne, but did not live long and Udayaditya died in 1123.
However, Bitti Deva would go on to become one of the greatest Hoysala kings.

References

Sources
 Dr. Suryanath U. Kamat, A Concise history of Karnataka from pre-historic times to the present, Jupiter books, MCC, Bangalore, 2001 (Reprinted 2002) OCLC: 7796041

1102 deaths
Hoysala kings
12th-century Indian Jains
12th-century Indian monarchs
Indian monarchs